The Pfaueninsel Palace is a Romantic-style building on the shore of the Havel in Berlin. Constructed on behalf of Frederick William II, the Lustschloss was completed in 1797. Today, the palace is a museum of the
Prussian Palaces and Gardens Foundation Berlin-Brandenburg.

See also

 Pfaueninsel, about the island

References

Bibliography
 "Die Pfaueninsel – Amtlicher Führer". Stiftung Preußischer Schlösser und Gärten. Potsdam, 2000.

External links
 "Pfaueninsel", history, data and information about the building at the official website of the Prussian Palaces and Gardens Foundation Berlin-Brandenburg

Houses completed in 1797
Palaces in Berlin
Royal residences in Berlin
Prussian cultural sites